Edward Riley may refer to:

Edward Riley (pastoralist) (1784–1825), Australian settler
Edward Riley (Australian politician) (1859–1943), member of the Australian House of Representatives
Edward Charles Riley (1892–1969), Australian politician
Edward F. Riley (1895–1990), American politician in the state of Washington
Bud Riley (Edward J. Riley Jr., 1925–2012), American football coach
Teddy Riley (Edward Theodore Riley, born 1967), American singer-songwriter

See also
Edward Reilly (disambiguation)